The King of the Wild Horses is a 1924 American silent Western film directed by Fred Jackman. It stars Edna Murphy, Rex the wonder horse, and Charley Chase. It was written and produced by Hal Roach and released through Pathé Exchange.

Plot
As described in a film magazine review, the Black, by right of might, is undisputed leader of a band of wild horses. By his intelligence and agility, he protects the herd and eludes various pursuiers. The Fielding ranch is under the charge of Wade Galvin, a villainous foreman, who has involved Fielding's weakling son in a cattle stealing escapade. Billy Blair, a cowpuncher, has two consuming passions. One is his love for Mary Fielding and the other is his desire to capture The Black. His perseverence is rewarded, for he wins both the young woman and horse. All three co-operate in frustrating further villainy on the part of Galvin, the foreman, and in bringing him to justice.

Cast

Preservation
A copy of The King of the Wild Horses is preserved in the Library of Congress film collection and the George Eastman Museum Motion Picture Collection. The Library's copy is the likely source for most DVDs.

References

External links

 
 

1924 films
Films directed by Fred Jackman
1924 Western (genre) films
American black-and-white films
Pathé Exchange films
Silent American Western (genre) films
1920s American films
1920s English-language films